Just Once a Great Lady (German:Einmal eine große Dame sein) may refer to:

 Just Once a Great Lady (1934 film), a German film directed by Gerhard Lamprecht
 Just Once a Great Lady (1957 film), a West German film directed by Erik Ode